Hau or HAU may refer to:

People and characters
 Hau (mythology), a Polynesian wind god
 Hau (surname)
 Hau Latukefu (AKA Hau, born 1976), Australian hip hop musician and radio host
 Hau, a character in Pokémon Sun and Moon

Places
 Hậu River, Vietnamese name for the Bassac River
 Haugesund Airport, Karmøy, in Norway
 Holy Angel University, in Angeles City, Philippines
 Hunan Agricultural University, in Changsha, Hunan, China
 Chaudhary Charan Singh Haryana Agricultural University, in India

Other uses
 Hau (sociology)
 HAU: Journal of Ethnographic Theory
 Hausa language according to ISO 639-2
 Hebrew Actors' Union, United States
 Hibiscus tiliaceus, a tree
 Hau, a superunit of the Tongan paʻanga currency
 Haemagglutinating unit (hau), a measure of Phytohaemagglutinin

See also

 Hao (disambiguation)
 How (disambiguation)
 Howe (disambiguation)